Indra English High School And Junior College is a self funded private school and college located at Indira Nagar, Mandala, Mankhurd (W), Mumbai - 400043. The school is recognized by Primary from B.M.C and Recognition. No E.C.R - 61, Secondary School No. S.33.02.075 and College (Science And Commerce) No. J.33.02.012 recognized by Government Of Maharashtra. The school belongs to Smt. Indra Educational and Medical Trust, which organized different activity in Education and Medical. The trust was established in 2003 having Minority status and 80-G (INCOME-TAX EXEMPTION). It is an ISO 9001:2015 Certified Institution. A UNIQUE school run by trust founded by a common man Dr. Ashok Gupta for the children from economically or educationally weak background. A State Board pattern education with co-curricular activities. 80 G exemption by Indian Government, for tax benefit of donors.

History 
Indra English High School And Junior College was initiated from 1 rent room in June 2003 with 42 admissions and 3 staff. The school got formally commenced in June 2003 from rented room at Indira Nagar, Mandala, Mankhurd (W), Mumbai - 400043. The school today has a 2000 sq. feet area constructed and was built up at a cost of 25 Lacs. The school today has a strength of over 750 students and 35 teachers and other staff members.

Infrastructure 
The School has a campus area of 2500 sq. feet of which school uses area of about 2250 sq. feet. It has a Hall of 800 sq. feet. The school has huge infrastructure and is equipped with Computer Lab, Audio-Visual Room, Library, Science Lab, Playground. The school also operates guidance and counseling center for the students. Also the school offers many facilities to the students.

Amenities 

 Library

 Computer Lab
 Playground
 Free Mid-Day Meal (STD. J.R.K.G. TO XII)
 Audio Visual
 Smart Class
 School Picnic
 Industrial Visit
 Free Extra Classes For Weak Students (Daily 2 hours from STD- I TO X)

Other social works 
 Swacch Bhaarat Abhiyaan

Co-curricular activities 
 Drawing Competitions
 Dance Competitions
 Flowers Day
 Fruit Day
 Food Festival
 Science Exhibition

References

External links 
 Official Website
Official Facebook Page
Official Twitter Handle
Official YouTube Channel 
News Paper Facebook Page

High schools and secondary schools in Mumbai
Educational institutions established in 2003
2003 establishments in Maharashtra